John E. Wilson House is a historic home located near Dunn, Sampson County, North Carolina.   It was built about 1878, and is a two-story, single pile, Italianate style frame dwelling with a rear ell.  It has a center-false-gable roof and is sheathed in weatherboard.  The front facade features an intricate double-tier porch.  It was built as a boarding house for teachers and students in conjunction with Shady Grove School and has been moved twice, in 1975 and in 1984.

It was added to the National Register of Historic Places in 1986.

References

Houses on the National Register of Historic Places in North Carolina
Italianate architecture in North Carolina
Houses completed in 1878
Houses in Sampson County, North Carolina
National Register of Historic Places in Sampson County, North Carolina